Kids Place Live is a channel on Sirius XM Radio that is the result of a merger between XM Kids and Kids Stuff. Sirius was a result of the U.S. Federal Communications Commission (FCC) approving the acquisition of XM Satellite Radio Holding, Inc. by Sirius Satellite Radio, Inc. on July 29, 2008, 17 months after the companies first proposed the merger.  Until February 9, 2010, DirecTV carried this on channel 868, but dropped Sirius XM programming in favor of going to MusicTap.  The channel name was changed on 2008-11-12.

Artists that are on the playlist include Andrew & Polly, The Brak Show, Tom Chapin, Parry Gripp, Randy Kaplan, They Might Be Giants, The Pop Ups, Recess Monkey, Emma Roberts, Justin Roberts, Rocknoceros, Secret Agent 23 Skidoo, SpongeBob SquarePants, SteveSongs, The Story Pirates, Trout Fishing in America, The Wiggles and "Weird Al" Yankovic.

The channel is staffed 24/7 and also has daily live call-in shows.

Characters

There are several animal characters that appear during "The Animal Farm with Kenny Curtis," which airs from 3pm to 5pm Eastern Time.  The animals interact with callers on the show and Kenny Curtis.  The featured animals include: Dirk, the fourth and forgotten chipmunk; Forrest Skunk, a kid version of Forrest Gump; Greg the tree sloth; Lufa the Porcupine; Bear E. White, a polar bear; and Lorenzo Llama, who has a strong fear of being touched.

Programming

Current Programming

Absolutely Mindy Show with Mindy Thomas (2001–present)
Animal Farm with Kenny Curtis (2001–present)
Couch Potato Stew (2008–present)
Automatik, overnights
Hot Lunch (2020–present)
Live From the Monkey House with Jack Forman (2013–present)
National Geographic Weird But True! (2016–present)
Weekend Party Mix with DJ Willy Wow (2021-present)

Upcoming Programming

Gustavo Sibilio Radio Show (2023-present)

Former Programming
Everyday Birthday Party with Laurie Berkner (2009–2011)
Kids Stuff (2001-2008)
Robbie Schafer's BandWagon (2009-2013)
RS's Stuck in a Real Tall Tree (2001-2009)
Story Pirates Radio (2013–2015)
The Wiggles Radio Show (2012–2014)
Putumayo Kids World Playground (2012–2019)
Kidz Bop BLOCK PARTY! (2012–2019)
Rumpus Room Concert Show (2001–2019)

References

XM Satellite Radio channels
Sirius XM Radio channels
Children's radio stations in the United States
Radio stations established in 2001